Nicaro Airport  was an airfield serving Nicaro in Cuba.

Facilities 
It has one runway which measures  in length.

Former Airbase

The airfield was once used by the Cuban Revolutionary Armed Forces, but no military aircraft or buildings exists on the site.

The abandoned airfield once had a single 4314 ft runway.

References

Defunct airports
Airports in Cuba
Mayarí
Buildings and structures in Holguín Province